Michele Gamba (born 2 October 1972) is a former Italian male long-distance runner who competed at two editions of the IAAF World Cross Country Championships at senior level (1998, 2001). and four of the IAAF World Half Marathon Championships (1996, 1997, 1998, 1999).

Biography
He won three national championships at senior level (cross country running: 2001, half marathon: 2003,5000 m: 2004). He won 1999 Florence Marathon.

References

External links
 

1972 births
Living people
Italian male cross country runners
Italian male long-distance runners
Athletics competitors of Fiamme Gialle